The Porsche Carrera Cup Germany, also known as Porsche Carrera Cup Deutschland, between 1986-1989 as Porsche 944 Turbo Cup; is a one-make racing series by Porsche based in Germany.

Champions

References

Auto Motor und Sport

External links
 

 
1986 establishments in Germany
Sports leagues established in 1986